The 1896 United States presidential election in New Hampshire took place on November 3, 1896 as part of the 1896 United States presidential election. Voters chose four representatives, or electors to the Electoral College, who voted for president and vice president.

New Hampshire overwhelmingly voted for the Republican nominee, former governor of Ohio William McKinley, over the Democratic nominee, former U.S. Representative from Nebraska William Jennings Bryan. McKinley won the state by a margin of 42.78%.

With 68.66% of the popular vote, New Hampshire would be McKinley's third strongest victory in terms of percentage in the popular vote after neighboring Vermont and Massachusetts. The state was also the best performance for National Democratic Party candidate John M. Palmer, who won 4.21% of the vote.

Bryan, running on a platform of free silver, appealed strongly to Western miners and farmers in the 1896 election, but held little-to-no appeal in the Northeastern states like New Hampshire.

Results

Results by county

See also
 United States presidential elections in New Hampshire

References

New Hampshire
1896
1896 New Hampshire elections